Gazzetta di Mantova is an Italian language local daily newspaper published in Mantua, in northern Italy.
It is the oldest newspaper in Italy, as well as in the world.

History and profile
Gazzetta di Mantova was established in 1664 making it the world's oldest newspaper still existing and published with the same name. The paper has its headquarters in Mantua. The owner of the paper is Gruppo Editoriale L’Espresso. The paper has an independent political stance.

The circulation of Gazzetta di Mantova was 34,000 copies in 2007. In 2013 Gruppo Editoriale L’Espresso claimed a circulation of 25,437 copies for the paper. The company reported that the circulation of the paper was 24,200 copies in 2014.

References

External links
 Official Website 
 

1664 establishments in Italy
Publications established in 1664
GEDI Gruppo Editoriale
Italian-language newspapers
Daily newspapers published in Italy